Lőrinc Galgóczi (born 24 September 1911, date of death unknown) was a Hungarian field handball player who competed in the 1936 Summer Olympics. He was part of the Hungarian field handball team, which finished fourth in the Olympic tournament. He played three matches.

References

External links
Profile

1911 births
Field handball players at the 1936 Summer Olympics
Hungarian male handball players
Olympic handball players of Hungary
Year of death missing